Scythris aenea is a moth of the family Scythrididae. It was described by Passerin d'Entrèves in 1984. It is found in Spain.

Etymology
The species name refers to the bronzy color of the body.

References

aenea
Moths described in 1984